Lloyd Hugh Williams (19 October 1933 – 25 February 2017) was a Welsh international rugby union player. He captained the Wales national rugby union team on three occasions in 1961–62. Williams played his club rugby for Cardiff RFC and was the younger brother of another Welsh international rugby union player and captain, Bleddyn Williams. Lloyd Williams died in February 2017 aged 83.

Notes

1933 births
2017 deaths
Barbarian F.C. players
Cardiff RFC players
Rugby union players from Taff's Well
Wales international rugby union players
Wales rugby union captains
Welsh rugby union players
Rugby union scrum-halves